Michael Louis Mussa (April 15, 1944 – January 15, 2012) was an American economist and academic. He was chief economist at the International Monetary Fund from 1991 to 2001 and was a member of the Council of Economic Advisers from 1986 to 1988. He was also a senior fellow at the Peterson Institute for International Economics from 2001 until his death in 2012.

References

External links
 Statement by IMF Managing Director Christine Lagarde on the Death of Michael Mussa ISRIA, January 16, 2012
 News Release by the Peterson Institute on the Death of Michael Mussa PIIE, January 17, 2012

1944 births
2012 deaths
Economists from California
Fellows of the Econometric Society
People from Los Angeles
Peterson Institute for International Economics
United States Council of Economic Advisers
University of California, Berkeley alumni
University of Chicago alumni
University of Chicago faculty
University of Rochester faculty